Jalalaqsi (Jalalassi) is a town in the south-central Hiran province of Somalia. It is situated on the Shebelle River, between Buuloburde and Jowhar.

Demographics
Jalalaqsi has a population of around 60,800 inhabitants. The broader Jalalaqsi District has a total population of 80,724 residents.

History
In the mid-1980s there were four refugee camps with a population of around 85,000 Somalis in Jalalaqsi. At that time it was the third largest settlement in Somalia after Mogadishu and Hargeisa.

Climate

Notable residents
Hassan Sheikh Mohamoud, President of Somalia

Notes

References
Jalalaqsi

External links
"Jalalaqsi Map — Satellite Images of Jalalaqsi" Maplandia World Gazetteer

Populated places in Hiran, Somalia